Saint-Planchers is a commune in the Manche department in Normandy in north-western France. It is the location of the Prieuré de l'Oiselière, a 12th-century priory that is classified as a Monument historique since 1989.

See also
Communes of the Manche department

References

Saintplanchers